The men's sprint competition at the FIS Nordic World Ski Championships 2023 was held on 23 February 2023.

Results

Qualification
The qualification was started at 13:27.

Quarterfinals
The top two of each heat and the two best-timed skiers advanced to the semifinals.

Quarterfinal 1

Quarterfinal 2

Quarterfinal 3

Quarterfinal 4

Quarterfinal 5

Semifinals
The top two of each heat and the two best-timed skiers advanced to the final.

Semifinal 1

Semifinal 2

Final

References

Men's sprint